Pedro Riquet (fl. 1598-1640) was a Spanish composer. His best known work is the romance Ya es tiempo de recoger of 1640.

References

Spanish Baroque composers
Spanish male classical composers
17th-century Spanish people